The 2010 San Jose State Spartans football team represented San Jose State University in the 2010 NCAA Division I FBS football season. The Spartans were led by first year head coach Mike MacIntyre. They played their home games at Spartan Stadium and are members of the Western Athletic Conference. They finished the season 1–12, 0–8 in WAC play.

Personnel

Coaching staff
Following the retirement of head coach Dick Tomey at the end of the 2009 season, San Jose State hired Mike MacIntyre as Tomey's replacement. Athletic director Tom Bowen planned on making a full 85 scholarship athletes available to the football team, as Academic Progress Rate penalties in 2006 limited yearly scholarships to between 67 and 72.

Roster

Schedule

Game Summaries

at No. 1 Alabama

at No. 11 Wisconsin

Southern Utah

at No. 13 Utah

UC Davis

at No. 23 Nevada

No. 3 Boise State

Fresno State

at New Mexico State

Utah State

at Hawaii

Louisiana Tech

at Idaho

References

San Jose State
San Jose State Spartans football seasons
San Jose State Spartans football